Alo (also known unofficially as Tu`a or the Kingdom of Futuna) is one of three official chiefdoms of the French territory of Wallis and Futuna, in Oceania, in the South Pacific Ocean. (The other two chiefdoms are Uvea and Sigave.)

Geography

Overview
The chiefdom known as Alo encompasses the eastern two thirds of Futuna Island -  out of ) - and all of Alofi Island ( (which is virtually uninhabited). It comprises nine villages, which together have a population is 1,950 (as of the 2018 census). The capital and largest village of Ali is Ono, which has about 738 residents. The current Tu`i Agaifo or king of the Kingdom of Alo is Lino Leleivai, who has served in this position since his coronation on 29 November 2018 (after the previous king, Filipo Katoa, abdicated because of health concerns).

Administrative division
The chiefdom is coextensive with the district of the same name. Alo’s nine villages (or municipalities) are as follows:

History

See also
Hoorn Islands
List of kings of Alo
Pointe Vele Airport

References

External links

Village populations
Area figures
Map: Lonely Planet
Map: Everyculture

Chiefdoms and districts of Wallis and Futuna
Kingdoms
Island countries